This article is a discography of albums and singles released by the guitarist-songwriter Steve Hackett.

Solo career
Camino Records was founded by Hackett with the original goal of re-releasing selections from his solo career, but Hackett eventually released new albums on the label.

Rock albums

Classical albums

Blues albums

Live albums

Video albums

Collaborative albums

Compilation albums
The Unauthorised Biography (1992)
Genesis Files (2002)
Premonitions: The Charisma Recordings 1975-1983 (2015)
Broken Skies Outspread Wings 1984-2006 (2018)

Singles
"How Can I?" / "Kim" (1978)
"Narnia" (remix) / "Please Don't Touch" (1978) – withdrawn release?
"Every Day" / "Lost Time in Cordoba" (1979)
"Clocks" (alternate version) / "Acoustic Set" (live) (1979)
"Clocks" (alternate version) / "Acoustic Set" (live) / "Tigermoth" (live) 12" single (1979)
"The Show" / "Hercules Unchained" (1980)
"Sentimental Institution" / "The Toast" (1980)
"Hope I Don't Wake" / "Tales from the Riverbank" (1981)
"Picture Postcard" / "Theme from 'Second Chance'" (1982)
"Cell 151" (single edit) / "The Air-Conditioned Nightmare" (1983) – UK #66
"Cell 151" (long version) / "The Air-Conditioned Nightmare" (live) / "Time Lapse at Milton Keynes" 12" single (1983)
"Cell 151" (track listing as above) limited edition 12" doublepack with shrinkwrapped 12" white label of Clocks 12" (track list as above) (1983)
"Walking Through Walls" (single remix)" (1983) withdrawn but 7" & 12" one-sided Utopia acetates were pressed
"A Doll That's Made In Japan (part 1)"/ "A Doll That's Made In Japan (part 2)"
"A Doll That's Made in Japan" (long version) / "Just the Bones" 12" single (1984)
"Days of Long Ago" (promo) (1991)
"Brand New" (radio edit) / "Brand New" (album version) (2003)
"Til These Eyes" / "Enter The Night" (radio mix) (2012) download only

with Squackett
"Sea of Smiles" / "Perfect Love Song" (2012)

Soundtracks
Outwitting Hitler (2001, score to the Showtime documentary)
Note: This was not an album, but consisted only of three instrumental tracks, each about a minute in length. They were only made available via a free MP3 download page on Steve's website. The same tunes were subsequently featured on Metamorpheus.

Appeared on
Sacred Scenes And Characters (1968) by Canterbury Glass - 1 track Prologue - The album was recorded in 1968 but published only in 2007. 
Two Sides of Peter Banks (1973) by Peter Banks (1 track : Knights (Reprise)) - With Phil Collins on drums.
Voo de Coracao by Ritchie (1984) (1 track : Voo de Coração)
Wind in the Willows by Eddie Hardin (1985) (1 track : Wind in the Willows)
Strangeland by Box of Frogs (1986) (2 tracks : Average and Trouble)
Orchestral Maneuvres: The Music of Pink Floyd by David Palmer and the Royal Philharmonic Orchestra (1991)
Gallery of Dreams by Gandalf (1992) (7 tracks and co-wrote End of the Rainbow)
Arkangel by John Wetton (1997) (2 tracks : Nothing Happens for Nothing and All Grown up)
Drivers Eyes by Ian McDonald (1999) (2 tracks : You Are a Part of Me and Straight Back to You)
Sinister by John Wetton (2001) (1 track : Real World)
Sheafs Are Dancing by Djabe (2003) (1 track : Reflections of Thiérache)
Emergent by Gordian Knot (2003) (3 tracks : Muttersprache, Some Brighter Thing and Singing Deep Mountain)
Hexameron by Nick Magnus (2004) (3 tracks : Singularity, Seven Hands of Time and The Power of Reason)
Checking Out of London by John Hackett  (2005) (5 tracks : Late Trains, The Hallway and the Pram, Ego & Id and Headlights)
? by Neal Morse (2005)
Swiss Choir by Chris Squire (2007)
Sacred Scenes and Characters by Canterbury Glass (2007; recorded 1968) (1 track : Prologue)
U-Catastrophe by Simon Collins (2008) (1 track : Fast Forward the Future)
Sipi Benefit Concert by Djabe (2009)
Sitting on the Top of Time by Jim McCarty (2009) (1 track : Living from the Inside Out)
 JL by Algebra, (2009) (1 track : Il molo deserto) https://www.discogs.com/it/Algebra-JL/release/7618045
 The Book of Bilbo and Gandalf by Marco Lo Muscio (2010) (1 track Galadriel)
Children of Another God by Nick Magnus (2010) (1 track : The Colony Is King)
Dirty nd Beautiful Volume 1 by Gary Husband (2010) (1 track)
In the Footsteps of Attila and Genghis by Djabe (2011)
Cavalli Cocchi, Lanzetti & Roversi by CCLR (2011) (1 track)
Dirty and Beautiful Volume 1 by Gary Husband (2010) (1 track)
Raised in Captivity by John Wetton (2011) (1 track)
Grace for Drowning by Steven Wilson (2011) (1 track)
Prog Exhibition 2 by Various Artists (2012) (2 tracks)
Talsete di Marsantino by L'Estate di San Martino (2012) (2 tracks)
Down and Up by Djabe (2012) (5 tracks)
The Rome Pro(g)ject by The Rome Pro(G)ject (2012) (2 tracks - "Down to the Domus Aurea" - "The Mouth of Truth" - both by Hackett/Ricca) www.vincenzoricca.it
Beneath the Waves by Kompendium (2012) (1 track "Lilly")
A Proggy Christmas by The Prog World Orchestra (2012) (1 track)
Captain Blue by Rob Cottingham (2012) (1 track)
Lifesigns by Lifesigns (2013) (1 track)
Playing the History by John Hackett, Marco Lo Muscio & Carlo Matteucci (2013) (4 track: "Hairless Heart", "After the Ordeal", "Hands of the Priestess", "Galadriel")
The Theory of Everything by Ayreon (2013) (1 track : The Parting)
Overnight Snow by Nick Fletcher & John Hackett (2013) (1 track : Three Mediterranean Sketches)
C:Ore by Duncan Parsons (2014) (1 track : J: Oi!, playing harmonica, joined by John Hackett, Gary Boyle, and Ton Scherpenzeel)
N'Monix by Nick Magnus (2014) (3 tracks : Eminent Victorians, Broken and Shadowland)
The Ghosts of Pripyat by Steve Rothery (2014) (2 tracks : Morpheus and Old Man of the Sea)
Torn Apart by Franck Carducci (2015) (1 track : Closer to Irreversible)
Courting The Widow by Nad Sylvan (2015)
Another Life by John Hackett (2015)
Cabdury-Hicks by Cadbury-Hicks (2015) (1 track : Just Another Honky-Tonk)
Citizen by Billy Sherwood (2015) (1 track : Man and the Machine)
Of Fate And Glory by The Rome Pro(G)ject II (2016) (3 tracks : Of Fate And Glory (RICCA HACKETT LEHMANN)- "S.P.Q.R." (RICCA HACKETT) - "The Pantheon's Dome" (RICCA HACKETT MONTOBBIO)) www.vincenzoricca.it
EXEGI MONVMENTVM AERE PERENNIVS by The Rome Pro(G)ject (2017) (2 tracks - "Down to the Domus Aurea" eclectic demo (RICCA HACKETT) - "EXEGI MONVMENTVM) www.vincenzoricca.it
The Secrets by Alan Parsons (2019) (Track: The Sorcerer's Apprentice)
Deconstructing Classics by Algebra (2019) (Track: La cura)
A Life in Yes - The Chris Squire Tribute (2019) (Track: The More We Live - Let Go)
On the Wings of the Wind (2019) by John Hackett and Marco Lo Muscio
Andrea Padova plays Lo Muscio (2019) by Andrea Padova and Marco Lo Muscio
All That I Am & All That I Was (2020) by Ms Amy Birks (track: I Wish)
Isolation (2020) by The Backstage (track: Covid Nights)
The Sound Of Dreams (2020) by Dave Minasian
Worlds On Hold (2021) by Prog Collective (track: Glory Days Ahead)
Dark Horizons (2021) by Illuminae (track: The Lighthouse)
Windhover (2021) by Lee Gobbi (track: Windhover)
Spiritus Mundi (2021) by Nad Sylvan (track: To A Child Dancing In The Wind)
Still Wish You Were Here (2021) by Various Artists (track: Shine On You Crazy Diamond)
Innocence And Illusion (2021) by Amanda Lehmann (tracks: Only Happy When It Rains, Forever Days, Shere The Small Things Go)
I Dreamed of Electric Sheep - Ho sognato pecore elettriche (2021) by PFM (track: Kindred Souls)
Sun's Signature (2022) by Sun's Signature
The Myth Of Mostrophus (2022) by Ryo Okumoto (track: Maximum Velocity)

With Genesis

Albums
Nursery Cryme (November 1971 #39 UK)
Foxtrot (October 1972 #12 UK)
Genesis Live (live, June 1973 #9 UK)
Selling England by the Pound (October 1973 #3 UK)
The Lamb Lies Down on Broadway (November 1974 #10 UK)
Rock Theatre (compilation, December 1975)
A Trick of the Tail (February 1976 #3 UK)
Wind & Wuthering (December 1976 #7 UK)
Spot the Pigeon (EP, May 1977 #14 UK)
Seconds Out (live, October 1977 #4 UK)
Three Sides Live (live, June 1982 #2 UK, appears on "It/Watcher of the Skies")
Genesis Archive 1967–75 (compilation, June 1998 #35 UK, appears on most tracks)
Turn It On Again: The Hits (compilation, October 1999 #4 UK, appears on "I Know What I Like (In Your Wardrobe)" and "The Carpet Crawlers 1999")
Genesis Archive 2: 1976–1992 (compilation, November 2000, appears on "Entangled (Live)," "It's Yourself," "Pigeons," and "Inside and Out")
Platinum Collection (compilation, November 2004 #21 UK, appears on "...In That Quiet Earth", "Afterglow", "Your Own Special Way", "A Trick of the Tail", "Ripples", "Los Endos", "The Lamb Lies Down on Broadway", "Counting Out Time", "The Carpet Crawlers", "Firth of Fifth", "The Cinema Show", "I Know What I Like (In Your Wardrobe)", "Supper's Ready" and "The Musical Box")

Singles
"Happy the Man" / "Seven Stones" (October 1972)
"I Know What I Like (In Your Wardrobe)" / "Twilight Alehouse" (February 1974; #21 UK)
"Counting Out Time" / "Riding the Scree" (November 1974)
"The Carpet Crawlers" / "Evil Jam (The Waiting Room Live)" (April 1975)
"A Trick of the Tail" / "Ripples" (March 1976)
"Your Own Special Way" / "It's Yourself" (February 1977; #43 UK; #62 US)

Video albums
The Genesis Songbook (documentary, July 2001)
The Video Show (compilation, November 2004, appears on "A Trick of the Tail", "Ripples", "Robbery, Assault and Battery" and "The Carpet Crawlers 1999")

With Djabe

Albums
Sipi Emlékoncert (2009)
In the Footsteps of Attila and Genghis (2011)
Summer Storms and Rocking Rivers (2013)
Live in Blue (2014)
Life Is a Journey - The Sardinia Tapes (2017)
It Is Never the Same Twice (2018)
Life Is a Journey - The Budapest Live Tapes (2018)
Back to Sardinia (2019)
The Magic Stag (2020)
The Journey Continues (2021)
Live at Porgy & Bess (2022)

Singles
"Erre táncolnak a kazlak" remix EP (2003)

Videos
Sipi Emlékoncert (2009)
15th Anniversary Concert (2011)
Down and Up - Live in Budapest (2013)
Live in Blue (2015)
Summer Storms and Rocking Rivers (2016)
It Is Never the Same Twice (2018)
Life Is a Journey - The Budapest Live Tapes (2018)
The Journey Continues (2021)

With Sonic Obsession
"Timeless" (1994, single)

With Quiet World
 1970 : The road - With John Hackett on acoustic guitar

With GTR

References

External links
 Official website
 
 

 
Discographies of British artists
Rock music discographies